The Marinhoa is a cattle breed from Portugal.

A large animal with harmonious forms. Thick elastic and prominent skin; light brown coat, tending to straw; docile temperament; long and flat head; bulky but not large abdomen; long wide and deep back and topsides; muscled members, strong, with good angulation; dark mucous; small horns; sub-concave profile.

The breed region is circumscribed almost exclusively to the Central Portugal in Aveiro District.

External links

Cattle breeds
Cattle breeds originating in Portugal
Portuguese products with protected designation of origin